Asbell is a surname. Notable people with the surname include:

Jim Asbell (1914–1967), American baseball player
Penny Asbell, American ophthalmologist
Samuel Karnarvon Asbell (1914–1965), Canadian politician

See also
Asbel Kiprop (born in 1989), Kenyan middle-distance runner